Baddiel and Skinner Unplanned is a British free-form television talk show hosted by comedians David Baddiel and Frank Skinner and produced by Avalon Television for ITV. It ran from 2000 to 2005. Its concept was developed at the Edinburgh Festival Fringe prior to the television series. Alongside the television series, the show had a run in the West End at the Shaftesbury Theatre between 17 April and 12 May 2001 from which a ‘Baddiel and Skinner Unplanned - Live in the West End’ DVD was released.

Format

The intro to the show begins with a slow pan along an empty street before focussing on actor Lewis Rose who sings the intro before the crowds come in to join with a chant of "It'll never work" and head into the theatre to watch the show. Baddiel and Skinner eventually join in with the crowds and enter themselves, singing "And neither will we again!"

The show features the two hosts sitting on a couch on-stage and responding to questions from the audience – at times rather seriously, but usually with bizarre digressions into satirical comedy. An audience member is chosen as "Secretary" and has the job of keeping a note of the topics covered on a white board. In practice, the personality of the secretary will also prompt many jokes – usually at his or her expense. At the end of the show, Skinner asks either the secretary or the audience to choose between two song books, and to pick a page number between 1 and 20. This process determines which song is performed by the duo, sung by Skinner with Baddiel accompanying him on piano (or, on at least one occasion, semi-acoustic guitar).

Topics of discussion are wholly mandated by the audience and have ranged from discussions of the war against Iraq and other political events to comments on the latest plot twists of popular soap operas and the Atkins diet. Skinner's Catholicism and Baddiel's Jewish culture are also occasional targets of humour (Baddiel describing Skinner's faith as being "insane" and Skinner often using a music-hall Jewish accent to hold mock dialogues among members of Baddiel's extended family, as well as both performers demonstrating how to "play the piano in a convincingly Jewish manner").

To avoid it becoming too similar to the pair's other show, Fantasy Football League, an unofficial rule was introduced to prevent discussion of football-related topics.

Series overview

Episodes

Other versions

In 2004, a similar series, with Australian comedy duo Merrick & Rosso, aired in Australia - Merrick and Rosso Unplanned.

Other 'unplanned' content
Baddiel & Skinner produced a series of podcasts covering the 2006 FIFA World Cup for Avalon Television and The Times.

A special edition for Comic Relief called Baddiel & Skinner unplanned & unpaid was done in front of a celebrity audience in 2001.

References

External links
 
 Off the telly Extended review of series one.

2000s British television talk shows
2000s British comedy television series
2000 British television series debuts
2005 British television series endings
ITV comedy
Television series by ITV Studios
English-language television shows